Ragni Piene (born 18 January 1947, Oslo) is a Norwegian mathematician, specializing in algebraic geometry, with particular interest in enumerative results and intersection theory.

Education and career
After a bachelor's degree from the University of Oslo in 1969 and a DEA from Université de Paris in 1970  Piene received a doctorate in mathematics from the Massachusetts Institute of Technology in 1976, advised by Steven Kleiman. Her dissertation was titled Plücker Formulas.

She was appointed professor at the University of Oslo in 1987.

Recognition
She was elected a member of the Norwegian Academy of Science and Letters in 1994,
and in 2012 she became a fellow of the American Mathematical Society and a member of the Academia Europaea. We is also one of the protagonists of the Women of mathematics exhibition.

Service
Since 2003 she has been a member of the executive committee of the International Mathematical Union, and was the chair of the Abel Committee from 2010–2011 to 2013–2014.

References

1947 births
Living people
Algebraic geometers
Massachusetts Institute of Technology School of Science alumni
Norwegian expatriates in the United States
Academic staff of the University of Oslo
Members of the Norwegian Academy of Science and Letters
Members of Academia Europaea
Fellows of the American Mathematical Society
Royal Norwegian Society of Sciences and Letters
20th-century Norwegian mathematicians
Norwegian women mathematicians
20th-century women mathematicians
21st-century women mathematicians
20th-century Norwegian women
Presidents of the Norwegian Mathematical Society